Irina Khaburdzania (born 25 October 1999) is a Georgian footballer who plays as a midfielder for Lanchkhuti and the Georgia women's national team.

Club career
Khaburdzania has played for FC Martve and Lanchkhuti in Georgia.

International career
Khaburdzania made her senior debut for Georgia on 11 June 2021 in a 3–2 friendly home win over Azerbaijan.

References

External links

1999 births
Living people
Women's footballers from Georgia (country)
Women's association football midfielders
FC Martve players
Georgia (country) women's international footballers